Muso may refer to:

 Muso (InuYasha), a character in the manga and anime series InuYasha
 Muso, a Thai exonym for the Lahu people
 Muso Health, nonprofit organisation in Mali
 Sello Muso (born 1986), footballer from Lesotho

See also 
 Musou (disambiguation), a Japanese word meaning 'The Only One'
 Musso (disambiguation)